McElmury is a surname. Notable people with the surname include:

Audrey McElmury (1943–2013), American cyclist
Jim McElmury (born 1949), American ice hockey player